Joe Knapp (Joseph Andrew Knapp) is an artist from Omaha, Nebraska. He is the lead singer and songwriter of Saddle Creek band Son, Ambulance. Knapp has also collaborated with friends and musicians such as Bright Eyes and David Dondero.

Joe was Nebraska State Chess Champion in 2012. He currently works for the City of Omaha Planning Department.

Album appearances
See also albums by Son, Ambulance.

Bright Eyes - Every Day and Every Night EP (1999, Saddle Creek Records)
Bright Eyes - Fevers and Mirrors (2000, Saddle Creek Records)
Ghosty - Three Pop Songs (2002)
David Dondero
sonambulance.com
Saddle Creek Records

American rock singers
Living people
Year of birth missing (living people)